Jonatan Ferreira Reis (born June 30, 1989) is a professional footballer from Codó, Maranhão, Brazil.

In 2017 Thai League 2, he played with Kasetsart FC. He was the top goalscorer of the league with 28 goals.

Club career

Inside Home Country
Born in Codó, Maranhão, Brazil, Reis began his career in the Brazil football league system with Anápolis in the 2015–2016 season.

Kasetsart
Reis signed a one-year deal with Thai club, Kasetsart on 1 February 2017 on a free transfer after being released by Anápolis. He was the top goalscorer of league with 28 goals.

Nakorn Pathom United
In late 2017 season, Reis agreed a deal to move to Nakhon Pathom United in the following season.  Unfortunately, Nakhon Pathom United was administratively relegated to Thai League 4 by the FA Thailand as they could not provide official documents about club licensing on time.

PT Prachuap
In the 2018 season Reis was loaned out to PT Prachuap to play in Thai League 1.

Honour
BG Pathum United
 Thai League 2: 2019
Individual
Thai League 2 Top Scorer: 2017 (28 Goals)

References

External links

Jonatan Reis
Jonatan Reis
1989 births
Expatriate footballers in Thailand
Jonatan Reis
Jonatan Reis
Jonatan Reis
Living people
Association football forwards
Brazilian footballers
Jonatan Reis
Sportspeople from Maranhão